Federalism in Malaysia dates back to the establishment of the Federated Malay States in Peninsular Malaysia, then known as Malaya. Federalism in Malaysia took a more concrete form with the establishment of the Federation of Malaya. The merger of Malaya with Singapore, North Borneo (now Sabah) and Sarawak further complicated the situation. As of 2008, although Malaysia is a de jure federation, many perceive it as a de facto unitary state. Some suggest that opposition triumphs in several of the 2008 state elections will alter the political climate and approach towards federalism.

State governments
The state governments are led by chief ministers (Menteri Besar or Ketua Menteri, the latter term being used in states without hereditary rulers), selected by the state assemblies (Dewan Undangan Negeri) advising their respective sultans or governors.

Resemblance of unitary state
Although Malaysia is a federal state, political scientists have suggested that its "federalism is highly centralised":

The 2008 general elections saw a loose coalition between the Democratic Action Party, People's Justice Party and Pan-Malaysian Islamic Party win a majority in five of the thirteen state legislative assemblies. Previously, the ruling Barisan Nasional coalition controlled twelve of the state governments, with the exception of Kelantan. In an editorial, The Sun suggested that this would herald changes for the relationship between state and federal governments:

References

 
Politics of Malaysia
Malaysia, federalism in
Law of Malaysia